Menachem Cohen (5 July 1922 – 11 March 1975) was an Israeli politician.

Biography
Born in Jerusalem during the Mandate era, Cohen helped organise illegal Jewish immigration from Syria. He worked as a director of the Neighbourhoods Department on Tel Aviv Workers Council, and was a representative of the neighbourhoods (in particular, the Hatikva Quarter) on Tel Aviv City Council.

In the 1949 Knesset elections he was on the Mapai list, but failed to win a seat. Although he entered the Knesset on 19 May 1951 as a replacement for the deceased David Remez, he lost his seat in the July 1951 elections. He returned to the Knesset following the 1959 elections, and was re-elected in 1961. In 1965 and in 1969 elections, he was elected from the Alignment alliance list. He lost his seat in the 1973 elections, and died in 1975.

References

External links

1922 births
1975 deaths
People from Jerusalem
Jews in Mandatory Palestine
Alignment (Israel) politicians
Mapai politicians
Israeli Labor Party politicians
Members of the 1st Knesset (1949–1951)
Members of the 4th Knesset (1959–1961)
Members of the 5th Knesset (1961–1965)
Members of the 6th Knesset (1965–1969)
Members of the 7th Knesset (1969–1974)